Anaphalis margaritacea, commonly known as the western pearly everlasting or pearly everlasting, is an Asian and North American species of flowering perennial plant in the family Asteraceae.

Description
The undersides of the leaves are densely covered in tiny hairs. The stems are dry and brittle. It blooms between June and September.

The plant is dioecious, meaning the pollen-producing (male) and seed-producing (female) flowers are borne on separate plants.

Taxonomy 
Varieties and subspecies
Anaphalis margaritacea var. cinnamomea (DC.) Herder ex Maxim. 
Anaphalis margaritacea subsp. japonica (Maxim.) Kitam. 
Anaphalis margaritacea var. margaritacea 
Anaphalis margaritacea var. yedoensis (Franch. & Sav.) Ohwi

Etymology 
The species' common name 'pearly everlasting' comes from the pearly white bracts.

Distribution and habitat 
It is widespread across most of Canada and the United States, as well as northwestern Mexico. Asian populations are found in China, the Russian Far East, Japan, Korea, northern Indochina, and the Himalayas. The species is reportedly naturalized in Europe though not native there. It prefers dry, sunny climates, but is hardy to temperatures well below freezing.

Ecology 
The leaves are host to the caterpillars of the American painted lady butterfly (Vanessa virginiensis) and the painted lady butterfly (Vanessa cardui).

Uses 
The leaves and young plants are edible when cooked.

References

External links
 
 

margaritacea
Flora of North America
Flora of Asia
Dioecious plants
Plants described in 1753
Taxa named by Carl Linnaeus